The New Zealand cricket team toured India in the 1964-65 cricket season. They played four Test matches against the Indian cricket team, with India winning one match and the other three being drawn.

Background 
New Zealand travelled to India after a three-match drawn Test series against Pakistan at home. The Indian Express pointed out that one of the "several lessons" they learnt from the series was the lack of genuine spin bowlers. In this regard, Vic Pollard and Graham Vivian were included in the squad to support left-arm spinner Bryan Yuile. It also added that "lapses in temperament" and a "shortage of batsmen with stroke and enterprise" were the two other weaknesses in the side. On the positives, their fast bowlers were in good form, alongside batsmen Ross Morgan and John Reid. The latter were to be complemented by Bert Sutcliffe, once considered the best left-handed batsman in the world. Before the series, captain John Reid mentioned that it was "hard going straight into the series without a loosening up match in Indian conditions." However, he rated his team better than the one that toured the country in 1955–56.

Squads

Touring party 
A 15-member New Zealand squad for the tour of India, Pakistan and England was announced by the New Zealand Cricket on 14 February 1965. John Reid was named the captain and Graham Dowling, his deputy. Bert Sutcliffe made a comeback to the side coming out of retirement after five years. Four players — Terry Jarvis, Vic Pollard, Bruce Taylor and Graham Vivian — made the squad for the time. The team manager for the tour was Walter Hadlee. The party arrived in Madras, the venue of the First test, on 24 February.

The team members were:
 John Reid, Wellington, captain & all-rounder
 Graham Dowling, Canterbury, vice-captain & opening batsman
 Frank Cameron, Otago, fast-medium bowler
 Richard Collinge, Central Districts, fast-medium bowler
 Bevan Congdon, Central Districts, all-rounder
 Terry Jarvis, Auckland, opening batsman
 Ross Morgan, Auckland, batsman
 Dick Motz, Canterbury, fast-medium bowler
 Vic Pollard, Central Districts, all-rounder
 Barry Sinclair, Wellington, batsman
 Bert Sutcliffe, Northern Districts, batsman
 Bruce Taylor, Canterbury, fast-medium bowler
 Graham Vivian, Canterbury, batsman and leg break bowler
 John Ward, Canterbury, wicket-keeper
 Bryan Yuile, Central Districts, left arm orthodox bowler

India squad 
The Indian selectors picked the same squad that played Australia at home earlier that season, with the exception of Indrajitsinhji, who was replaced by Farokh Engineer as the wicket-keeper in the playing eleven. The former was included in the reserves. The Nawab of Pataudi, Jr. was retained as the captain. The squad was announced on 15 February 1965.

The team members were:

 Nawab of Pataudi, Jr., captain
 Chandu Borde
 BS Chandrasekhar
 Ramakant Desai
 Salim Durani
 Farokh Engineer, wicket-keeper
 Indrajitsinhji, wicket-keeper
 ML Jaisimha
 Vijay Manjrekar
 Bapu Nadkarni
 Dilip Sardesai
 Ramesh Saxena
 Hanumant Singh
 Venkataraman Subramanya
 S. Venkataraghavan

Series summary

First Test

Second Test

Third Test

Fourth Test

References

External links
 Tour home at ESPNcricinfo
 

1965 in Indian cricket
1965 in New Zealand cricket
Indian cricket seasons from 1945–46 to 1969–70
International cricket competitions from 1960–61 to 1970
1964-65